Jerash FC is a Saudi Arabian football club based in Ahad Rafidah, Asir and competes in the Saudi Second Division, the third tier of Saudi football. The club was founded in 1979 by Dalim bin Saad Al-Qahtani.

Jerash won their first promotion to the Saudi Second Division during the 2021–22 season after finishing first in their group. They lost in the semi-finals to eventual champions Al-Suqoor.

Current squad 

As of 30 September 2022:

References

External links

Football clubs in Saudi Arabia
Football clubs in Ahad Rafidah
1979 establishments in Saudi Arabia
Association football clubs established in 1979